Tomislav Kaloperović (31 January 1932 – 15 January 2002) was a Yugoslav and Serbian footballer and coach.

External links
 
 Tomislav Kaloperović at the Serbia national football team website 
 Tomislav Kaloperović at mackolik.com 

1932 births
2002 deaths
People from Obrenovac
Serbian footballers
Yugoslav footballers
Association football midfielders
OFK Beograd players
FK Partizan players
Calcio Padova players
NAC Breda players
Royale Union Saint-Gilloise players
Wiener Sport-Club players
NK Olimpija Ljubljana (1945–2005) players
Yugoslav First League players
Serie A players
Austrian Football Bundesliga players
Belgian Pro League players
Challenger Pro League players
Eerste Divisie players
Yugoslavia international footballers
Yugoslav expatriate footballers
Yugoslav expatriate sportspeople in Italy
Yugoslav expatriate sportspeople in the Netherlands
Yugoslav expatriate sportspeople in Belgium
Yugoslav expatriate sportspeople in Austria
Expatriate footballers in Italy
Expatriate footballers in the Netherlands
Expatriate footballers in Belgium
Expatriate footballers in Austria
Serbian football managers
Yugoslav football managers
NK Olimpija Ljubljana (1945–2005) managers
Galatasaray S.K. (football) managers
Bursaspor managers
Eskişehirspor managers
Mersin İdman Yurdu managers
FK Partizan managers
Fenerbahçe football managers
FK Radnički Pirot managers
FK Vojvodina managers
Apollon Smyrnis F.C. managers
AEL Limassol managers
FK Napredak Kruševac managers
Yugoslav First League managers
Süper Lig managers
Super League Greece managers
Cypriot First Division managers
Yugoslav expatriate football managers
Yugoslav expatriate sportspeople in Turkey
Yugoslav expatriate sportspeople in Greece
Yugoslav expatriate sportspeople in Cyprus
Expatriate football managers in Turkey
Expatriate football managers in Greece
Expatriate football managers in Cyprus